Pannonia was a province of the Roman Empire.

Pannonia or Pannonian may also refer to:

Places
 Basin of Pannonia, a geomorphological region (plain) in Central Europe
 Sea of Pannonia, an ancient (former) sea in Central Europe
 Steppe of Pannonia, a grassland ecosystem in the Pannonian Plain 
 Diocese of Pannonia, a late Roman diocese
 Pannonia (Byzantine province), a Byzantine province
 March of Pannonia, a Frankish province
 Principality of Lower Pannonia, a Slavic principality in the 9th century vassal to the Franks
 Pannonia, the territory of the medieval kingdom of Hungary and Rex Pannoniae (Pannonicorum in medieval Latin), the king of Hungary; see  Hungary

Science
Pannonian (stage), the Paratethys domain (Central Europe, west Asia) in the stratigraphy; see List of geochronologic names
1444 Pannonia, an asteroid
Pannonia, a part of the surface of the asteroid 21 Lutetia

Other
 Pannónia, a brand of motorcycles manufactured in Hungary; see Jawa 350
 Pannonia Express, an InterCity passenger train from from Budapest to Bucharest
 Panonija, a village in Serbia

See also
 Upper Pannonia (disambiguation)
 Lower Pannonia (disambiguation)
 Eastern Pannonia (disambiguation)
 Northern Pannonia (disambiguation)
 Southern Pannonia (disambiguation)
 Pannonian Croatia (disambiguation)
 Pannonian language (disambiguation)
 PannóniaFilm, the largest animation studio in Hungary
 Pannonians, an ancient people
 La Pannonie, an old Cistercian farm near Rocamadour in France, and a castle built in the 15th and 18th century